West End Park may refer to:

Ballparks
Burns Park (Detroit), a former ballpark of the Detroit Tigers of the American League
Kavanaugh Field, a former ballpark of the Little Rock Travelers of the Southern Association
West End Park (Houston), a former ballpark of the Houston Buffaloes of the Texas League
West End Park (Kinston, North Carolina), a former ballpark of the Kinston Indians of the Carolina League
West End Park or Slag Pile Field, a former ballpark of the Birmingham Barons of the Southern League
West End Park or West End Grounds, a former ballpark of the Milwaukee West Ends of the League Alliance

Football grounds
Recreation Park, Alloa, grounds of Alloa Athletic F.C. of the Scottish Championship

Outdoor parks
Kelvingrove Park, a park in Glasgow
West End Park, a park in Flagami, Miami
West End Park, a park in Frostburg, Maryland
West End Park, a park in Marshall, Texas
West End Park, a park in New Iberia, Louisiana
West End Park, a park in West End, Atlanta
West End Park, a park in West End, Houston
West End Park, a park in West End, New Orleans
West End Park, a park in West End, Roanoke, Virginia
West End Park, a park in West End, Pittsburgh
West End Park, a park in Wood River, Illinois